Utricularia adpressa is a small, probably annual, carnivorous plant that belongs to the genus Utricularia. It is endemic to Central and South America and is found in Belize, Brazil, French Guiana, Guyana, Suriname, Trinidad, and Venezuela. It was also said to be collected from Colombia by Alvaro Fernández-Pérez, but those specimens are actually U. chiribiquitensis. It was originally named by Philipp Salzmann but formally described and published by Augustin Saint-Hilaire and Frédéric de Girard in 1838.

See also 
 List of Utricularia species

References 

Carnivorous plants of Central America
Carnivorous plants of South America
Flora of Belize
Flora of Brazil
Flora of French Guiana
Flora of Guyana
Flora of Suriname
Flora of Trinidad and Tobago
Flora of Venezuela
adpressa